Noé Willer (real name: Hubert Sebban) is a former French singer. He was active from the 1960s to the early 1990s. He achieved success with his 1985 hit "Toi, femme publique", which peaked at No. 11 in France. He also composed songs for various artists, such as Nicolas Pinelli, Au Fil du Temps, Daniel Hamelin, Flash !, Michel Steffen, Sweeties, Silver, Madéï Thémis and Harry Williams.

Discography

Albums
 1986: "En Version Originelle"

Singles
 1960s: "À quoi, à quoi"
 1960s: "Comme un papillon"
 1960s: "On n'a pas les pieds sur terre"
 1980s: "Qu'est-ce que c'est"
 1971: "Pouce"
 1972: "Le Monde à l'envers"
 1974: "Adieu Nina"
 1976: "Monique"
 1978: "Attends un peu"
 1982: "En haute fidélité"
 1984: "Je funambule"
 1985: "Toi, femme publique" – No. 11 in France
 1986: "L'Épouvantail"
 1986: "Sur minitel"
 1988: "En transit"
 1990: "La Nuit"

References

French-language singers
French male singers
French pop singers
Living people
French disco singers
Year of birth missing (living people)